Robert Godard (7 February 1913 – 5 October 1996) was a French racing cyclist. He rode in the 1937 Tour de France.

References

1913 births
1996 deaths
French male cyclists
Place of birth missing